Batshaw may refer to:

Organizations 
 Batshaw Youth and Family Centres, a youth protection centre

People 
 Harry Batshaw (1902–1984), Canadian lawyer and a justice of the Quebec Superior Court
 Manuel G. Batshaw (1915–2016), Canadian social worker
 Mark Batshaw (1945-), American pediatrician